Peppermint Park is a direct-to-video children's show consisting of six volumes, released in 1987 and 1988 on VHS. The show is a mixture of live action, animation, and puppets. Characters included Ernie, who sang a song about the letter M; Snorkee, a reptile who is often oblivious to his surroundings and lacks common sense; Maynard, an elderly man who laments over his wasted youth; and Piggle, a pig with a big appetite whose voice was similar to that of Kermit the Frog, among others. Many of the show's elements seem to have been copied from Sesame Street.

Production and release
The series was directed and produced by John Horton and Mark V International and released by Televidics Productions. Most of the puppets were created by Dann O'Quinn, but volumes four through six also featured puppets created by Dave Chapman. Human characters included "The Story Lady" (played by Melody Knighton, who also assisted in the operations of some of the puppets) and "Magic Megan" (played by Deanna Hawkins). Additionally, animated segments were done by "Those Designers", Inc., and the music was composed by Tuesday Productions and John Horton. Most likely due to very poor sales, budget problems, and/or negative reviews, the series was cut short and was canceled sometime in 1988. By this point, the six volumes had already gone out of print. For at least 1990 and 1991, it was distributed to Low-Power TV stations by Enoki Films USA.

Reception and inspiration
Nick Antosca, creator and showrunner of SyFy's series Channel Zero, watched Peppermint Park and other "really creepy old children's TV shows" for inspiration for the puppet show in season one, Candle Cove (2016).

American artist Andrew Norman Wilson remembered as a kid "being terrified of an unexplained dance sequence by a breakaway puppet dressed to look like a scarecrow." But rewatching clips posted online a few years ago he said, "my relationship with the dancing scarecrow has shifted from horror to obsession." He created Reality Models, an extended remake of that scene for a 2016 exhibit.

Screen Rant included the series in a 2017 list of forgotten creepy kid's shows. They suggested it is the "uncanny valley" and "melancholy voice acting" which makes the episodes "unnerving".

In 2019, Cracked.com included the series in a list of nightmarish children's characters. The Found Footage Festival's "VCR Party Live!" channel also mentioned the "uncanny valley" and included a clip from the series with a puppet singing about the letter M.

References

External links
 

1987 direct-to-video films
Film and television memes
Internet memes
Direct-to-video television series
American television shows featuring puppetry
American television series with live action and animation
Personal development television series